Martuni or Khojavend is a town de facto in the breakaway‎ Republic of Artsakh as the centre of its Martuni Province, and the de jure centre of the Khojavend District of Azerbaijan, in the disputed region of Nagorno-Karabakh. It is approximately 41 kilometers east of the regional capital, Stepanakert. It has a population of 5,700 as of 2015.

The town has an ethnic Armenian-majority population, and also had an Armenian majority in 1989.

Etymology 
The name Martuni originates from the nom de guerre of Armenian Bolshevik revolutionary and official Alexander Miasnikian. The name Khojavend is of Persian origin.

History 
Excavations in the settlement have uncovered a number of tombs dating to the Neolithic and Bronze Ages. Martuni is also home to several ruined medieval churches and remains of settlements, and khachkars have also been preserved.

Martuni was founded by local Armenians as a village named Khonashen, where shen means village and khona, depending on the source, allows different interpretations (namely, “village, dwelling” or “reservoir, well, spring”). In 1925, the settlement was transformed into a city and renamed Martuni.

During the Soviet period, Martuni was the capital of the Martuni District in the Nagorno-Karabakh Autonomous Oblast. The population of the town, grouped into kolkhozes, largely occupied itself with raising livestock, grape growing, wheat cultivation, and gardening.

Nagorno-Karabakh conflict

First Nagorno-Karabakh War 
Martuni, and the district itself, became a frontline city during the latter stages of the First Nagorno-Karabakh War. In early February 1992, Vazgen Sargsyan, then Defence Minister of Armenia, appointed Monte Melkonian as Chief of Headquarters and assigned him to lead the defense of Martuni and the surrounding regions. On October 2, 1992, Armenian armed forces captured the region around Martuni. According to an Azerbaijani source, considerable damage was done to the infrastructure of 10 villages settled by Azerbaijanis in the region during the war. Melkonian remained as regional commander until he was killed in combat in June 1993.

2020 Nagorno-Karabakh war 
From the very first days of the 2020 Nagorno-Karabakh war (started on 27 September 2020), Martuni was subjected to artillery shelling by the armed forces of Azerbaijan. This led to the disconnection of the city from electricity and gas supply. On 1 November, Azerbaijani aviation launched an airstrike on the city. The Armenian detachments managed to hold their positions in Martuni until the ceasefire was established.

On 15 November 2020, Russian peacekeeping contingent formed an observation post in the city. On 13 February 2021, the specialists of the International Mine Action Center of the Ministry of Defense of the Russian Federation completed the clearance of the territory in the Martuni region. On 1 March, a block-modular town was commissioned for the residence of military personnel of the Russian peacekeeping contingent.

Historical and cultural heritage 
The town has a house of culture commonly called "The Opera", and the Church of St. Nerses the Great, opened in 2004. The Russian 19th-century Gevorgavan Church is located near Martuni.

Economy and culture 
The population mainly works in different state institutions as well as with agriculture and animal husbandry. As of 2015, Martuni has a municipal building, a house of culture, two schools, a music school, two kindergartens, a youth centre, 36 commercial enterprises, two factories and a regional hospital. The community of Martuni includes the villages of Kajavan and Kakavadzor.

Gallery

Climate

Demographics

References

External links 

 
 

Cities and towns in the Republic of Artsakh
Populated places in Martuni Province
Populated places in Khojavend District